The Canton of Crécy-en-Ponthieu  is a former canton situated in the department of the Somme and in the Picardie region of northern France. It was disbanded following the French canton reorganisation which came into effect in March 2015. It had 6,023 inhabitants (2012).

Geography 
The canton is organised around the commune of Crécy-en-Ponthieu in the arrondissement of Abbeville. The altitude varies from 7m at Dominois to 142m at Domléger-Longvillers for an average of 61m.

The canton comprised 21 communes:

Le Boisle
Boufflers
Brailly-Cornehotte
Conteville
Crécy-en-Ponthieu
Dominois
Domléger-Longvillers
Dompierre-sur-Authie
Estrées-lès-Crécy
Fontaine-sur-Maye
Froyelles
Gueschart
Hiermont
Ligescourt
Maison-Ponthieu
Neuilly-le-Dien
Noyelles-en-Chaussée
Ponches-Estruval
Vitz-sur-Authie
Yvrench
Yvrencheux

Population

See also
 Arrondissements of the Somme department
 Cantons of the Somme department
 Communes of the Somme department

References

Crecy-en-Ponthieu
2015 disestablishments in France
States and territories disestablished in 2015